ProjectManager.com is an online project management software which is a scalable software as a service (SaaS) for business managers and teams. The software is developed by ProjectManager.com, Inc. in Austin, TX.

ProjectManager.com (sometimes referred to as "ProjectManager") provides a customizable online dashboard for keeping track of projects, team collaboration, as well as a task manager for creating project plans.

The company was founded in New Zealand in 2008 by CEO Jason Westland. In 2014, Westland moved to the United States and opened a small office in Austin, TX. Then in 2018, ProjectManager.com announced that they had officially moved their headquarters to Austin, with most of their staff working in the newly expanded Austin office while development teams continue to work in New Zealand.

It was documented that the company's success was helped by their push on Social Media, and was discussed in Forbes magazine.

ProjectManager.com won a Project Management Institute (PMI) award in July 2009. The company was also awarded with two awards from Deloitte, the fast 50 awards and also the 2013 Asia Pacific Fast 500 award. In 2019, ProjectManager.com's rapid growth landed the company on the Inc. 5000 list of fastest growing companies in the United States, as well as the Fast50 list of fastest growing companies in Austin, TX.

ProjectManager.com's clients include the United Nations, the US military, Boeing, NASA and Volvo

ProjectManager.com has been reviewed in several publications including;
Computerworld Magazine
CRN Magazine
PM Network Magazine 
Projects at Work
Unlimited Magazine

See also 

 Project management software
 Collaborative software

References

External links 
 

Collaborative software
Project management software
Software companies of New Zealand
Software companies established in 2008
Projects established in 2008